Pasgah-e Marzi Pol-e Sharqi (also Romanized as Pāsgāh Marzī Pol-e Sharqī) is a village in Atrak Rural District, Dashli Borun District, Gonbad-e Qabus County, Golestan Province, Iran. At the 2006 census, its population was 23, in 6 families.

References 

Populated places in Gonbad-e Kavus County